Lomovo is a rural locality (a village) in Kucherbayevsky Selsoviet, Blagovarsky District, Bashkortostan, Russia. The population was 107 as of 2010. There are 2 streets.

Geography 
Lomovo is located 43 km northwest of Yazykovo (the district's administrative centre) by road. Klimentovka is the nearest rural locality.

References 

Rural localities in Blagovarsky District